Novokosino may refer to:
 Novokosino District
 Novokosino (Moscow Metro)